Tarlan Karimov (born 14 September 1986, Sumgayit) is an Azerbaijani judoka.  He won a silver medal at the 2011 European Judo Championships and reached the repêchage round of the 2011 World Judo Championships.

At the 2012 Summer Olympics, he won his first match against Musa Mogushkov, then beat Ahmed Awad, before losing to Sugoi Uriarte in the quarterfinals.  Karimov qualified for the repechage, but lost in the first round of that to Paweł Zagrodnik.

References

External links
 
 

Azerbaijani male judoka
Living people
People from Sumgait
1986 births
Judoka at the 2012 Summer Olympics
Olympic judoka of Azerbaijan
European Games competitors for Azerbaijan
Judoka at the 2015 European Games